Zoom Air, legally Zexus Air Services, was an Indian regional airline based at Indira Gandhi International Airport in Delhi.

History
Zoom Air was established in April 2013 by Surender Kumar Kaushik as Zexus Air and the Indian civil aviation ministry issued it a No Objection Certificate in 2014. In September 2016, the airline took delivery of its first aircraft, a Bombardier CRJ200. Zoom Air received its air operator's certificate on 3 February 2017 and began operations on 15 February with a flight from Delhi to Durgapur via Kolkata. As of March 2017, Zoom Air flew to seven destinations in India using two Bombardier CRJ200's.

In July 2018, the operating license of the airline was suspended by the Directorate General of Civil Aviation (DGCA) of India due to safety concerns. All operations were suspended until 31 October 2019, when the airline restarted operation.

On 25 Mar 2022, the NCLT agreed to initiate Insolvency proceeding against Zoom Air. On 26 March 2022 in a notice to the creditors, Administrator Aashish Gupta on behalf of the Tribunal – that deals with the winding up of Indian companies, ordered the commencement of a corporate insolvency resolution process against Zexus Air Services Private Limited. The estimated date of closure of the insolvency resolution process for Zexus Air is set as 21 September 2022 – 180 days from the commencement date. Zoom Air Promoters and other Stakeholders have 90 days after the commencement of Insolvency proceedings to re-take control of the company through agreements with Creditors.

Corporate affairs
Zoom Air was the brand name for Zexus Air Services. The company was headquartered in Gurgaon, and its chief executive officer was Koustav Dhar. Zoom Air had been funded with Rs 20 crore equity and through private group Ravi Shankar Singh.

Destinations
The airline flies to the following destinations as of January 2020:

Fleet

Current fleet
As of November 2021 the Zoom Air fleet consisted of the following aircraft:

References

External links
 

Airlines of India
Airlines established in 2013
Airlines established in 2019
Airlines disestablished in 2018
2013 establishments in Delhi
Indian companies disestablished in 2018
Indian companies established in 2013
Indian companies established in 2019